Joseph A. Dandurand is a Kwantlen Aboriginal (Xalatsep) from Kwantlen First Nation in British Columbia. He is a poet, playwright, and archaeologist

Dandurand received a Diploma in Performing Arts from Algonquin College and studied Theatre and Direction at the University of Ottawa. His produced plays include Shake, Crackers and Soup (1994), No Totem for My Story (1995), Where Two Rivers Meet (1995), and Please Don't Touch the Indians (1998) for the Red Path Theater in Chicago. He has also authored a radio script, St Mary's which was produced by CBC Radio in 1999. His latest play Shake, was featured at the 20th Weesageechak Begins to Dance festival of new plays in Toronto, Ontario.

His poems have appeared in numerous journals and anthologies and are collected in Upside Down Raven, I Touched the Coyote's Tongue, and burning for the dead and scratching for the poor, Looking into the eyes of my forgotten dreams, Shake, 2005, Buried, 2007, and I Want, published by Leaf Press in 2015.

He was the Indigenous Storyteller in Residence at Vancouver Public Library in 2019.

In 2022 he was the winner of the Latner Writers' Trust Poetry Prize.

Theatre work 
Joseph has been a Playwright-in-Residence for the Museum of Civilization in Hull, in 1995 and for Native Earth in Toronto in 1996. Arigon Starr acted in his Wooden Indian Woman.

Writing Available Online 
 St. Mary's III
 St. Mary's IV
 Paint
 Fort Langley

Books by Joseph A. Dandurand

Plays 

Please Do Not Touch the Indians,  renegade planets publishing.

Poetry 

 "Buried", skyuks press 2007
 shake, skyuks press 2005
 looking into the eyes of my forgotten dreams, Kegedonce Press, 2000. Reprinted by Hushion House (Feb. 2004)
 Review in Prairie Fire: a Canadian Magazine of New Writing

Upside Down Raven
I Touched the Coyote's Tongue,
burning for the dead and scratching for the poor
I Want (Leaf Press, 2015)

Anthologies 
 North American Indian Drama, Alexander Street Press.
 Genocide of the Mind, Marijo Moore (Editor), Thunder's Mouth Press.
 Gatherings, The En'owkin Journal of First North American Peoples
 A Retrospective of the First Decade, Volume 10, Theytus Books.
 An Anthology of Canadian Native Literature in English,
 Daniel David Moses & Terry Goldie (Editors), Oxford University Press.
 Mother Earth Perspectives: Gatherings, Vol. III, Theytus Books, Ltd.
 Unmasking the Faces of Our Divided Nations: Gatherings, Vol. II, Theytus Books, Ltd.

References

External links
 Author's page at Kegedonce Press
 This article incorporates text from Nativewiki under the GFDL license.

20th-century Canadian poets
20th-century Canadian male writers
Canadian male poets
21st-century Canadian poets
20th-century Canadian dramatists and playwrights
21st-century Canadian dramatists and playwrights
First Nations dramatists and playwrights
University of Ottawa alumni
Sto:lo people
Living people
Year of birth missing (living people)
Canadian male dramatists and playwrights
First Nations poets
21st-century Canadian male writers
20th-century First Nations writers
21st-century First Nations writers